The Association is the Association's fifth studio album. In the US charts, the album peaked at number 32 in the last week of October 1969. None of the singles broke into Billboard charts. The single "Goodbye Forever" was reworked from the previous album project,  Goodbye, Columbus, as is heard in its lyrics about the relationship between the characters played by Richard Benjamin and Ali MacGraw in the film Goodbye, Columbus.

The album's musical style pushes the boundaries of pop rock. It was the last studio album featuring guitarist Russ Giguere, who left for a solo career in 1971.

Track listing

References

The Association albums
1969 albums
Albums produced by John Boylan (record producer)
Warner Records albums